Saybrook College is one of the 14 residential colleges at Yale University.  It was founded in 1933 by partitioning the Memorial Quadrangle into two parts: Saybrook and Branford.

Unlike many of Yale's residential colleges that are centered on one large courtyard, Saybrook has two courtyards—one stone and one grass, hence the college cheer beginning "Two courtyards, stone and grass: two courtyards kick your ass."

Saybrook College was one of the original Yale Residential Colleges. Its name comes from the original location of the university, Old Saybrook, Connecticut. The college has the second highest student-to-land-area ratio of any of the colleges (after Hopper College).

Saybrook students are known on campus for "the Saybrook Strip", a ritual performed during football games at the end of the third quarter.  Both male and female college residents strip down to their underwear (some seniors remove all their clothing during The Game) to accompaniment by the Yale Precision Marching Band, which formerly played "The Stripper" or "Sweet Child o' Mine" but now chooses different tunes from game to game. Saybrook is also known for its repeated wins of the Gimbel Cup, which goes to the college with the highest average GPA. Saybrook has won the cup 11 times, four more than the next most frequent winner, Ezra Stiles College. Saybrook won most recently in 2007.

The college was renovated during the 2000-2001 year.

Saybrook College was featured in a chase scene in Indiana Jones and the Kingdom of the Crystal Skull, part of which was filmed on Yale's campus in late June and early July 2007.

Buildings and architecture

The building now home to as Saybrook and Branford Colleges was built as the Memorial Quadrangle on the site of what was once the old gymnasium. Designed by James Gamble Rogers, construction on the quadrangle began in 1917 and finished in 1922. In 1928, Edward Harkness, who had funded the Memorial Quadrangle project, gave Yale funding to build eight residential colleges, and administrators decided to reconfigure the building into two of the new colleges. The two northern courtyards became the center of Saybrook College, and a wall of dormitories on the college's south side was demolished to build a dining hall and common room for the new college.

The courtyards are named for the towns Yale occupied before its move to New Haven: Killingworth Court after Killingworth, Connecticut, where Rector Abraham Pierson first held classes, and Saybrook Court after Saybrook, Connecticut, where it resided as the Collegiate School from 1703 to 1718. Among the flagstones of each courtyard is a millstone originating from their respective namesakes. The main courtyards are also decorated with carvings and inscriptions. Around the entryways are the stone heads of various associates of Yale University, including Vance McCormick, former chairman of the Yale Corporation's architectural planning committee, and Russell Chittenden, former director of the Sheffield Scientific School. In Saybrook Court are the arms of several American universities and of Elihu Yale and Edward Harkness. In Killingworth Court are the arms of Yale, Harvard, and Saybrook's sister colleges Adams House and Emmanuel College. Each student room is decorated with panes of stained glass from G. Owen Bonawit.

Wrexham Tower, modeled after the tower of St. Giles' Church in Wrexham, Wales, stands in the college's westernmost corner over a very small courtyard of its own. In the tower's base is an inscribed stone sent from St. Giles' as a gift to Yale. On the wall across from the tower's entrance is a plaque commemorating James Gamble Rogers.

Saybrook's freshmen were housed in Lanman-Wright Hall and Bingham Hall on Old Campus (as were the freshmen of Pierson College). Lanman-Wright Hall was designed by William Adams Delano and constructed in 1912. Starting in the fall of 2011, Saybrook's freshmen are now housed in Vanderbilt Hall.

Arms and badge
The arms of Saybrook College are the quartering of the arms of William Fiennes, 1st Viscount Saye and Sele and of Robert Greville, 2nd Baron Brooke, who were the early promoters of the Saybrook Colony, where Yale would later be founded. The arms of Saybrook College are described heraldically as: Quarterly I and IV azure, three lions rampant or; II and III sable, an engrailed cross within a border engrailed both or, and five roundels sable on the cross.

The badge of Saybrook College is the grapevine, derived from the original seal of Saybrook Colony. The badge appears carved in various places around the college.

Saybrook strip song
The words to the Saybrook strip song change to accommodate the names of the current Head of College and Dean. The song is sung between the third and fourth quarters of every football game, as well as other times that the members of the college disrobe (such as before the Midnight Mile, a one-mile run for charity in September).

Heads and Deans
Elisha Atkins was a beloved master who served for 10 years from 1975-1985, and frequently welcomed students into his quarters for 1x1 socializing and intimate small group teas with the many famous and inspiring global citizens who cycled through Yale.  After his tenure, he was replaced by Ann Ameling, who received accolades for being the first female master of Saybrook, but also got huge demerits for her perceived coldness toward students relative to her predecessor, and also for her shutting down, with no appeal, the venerable Saybrook tradition of Stickball, played in the lower courtyard for many decades before her arrival. 

Antonio Lasaga, a highly regarded geochemist, began a term as master in 1996. His service abruptly ended in 1998 when the FBI searched his house for a collection of child pornography, and in 2002 he was given a 20-year jail sentence for the sexual assault of a child. Mary Miller, a scholar of Mesoamerican art, was appointed Master in 1999 to restore the college's structure and morale. After a nine-year term, Miller was appointed Dean of Yale College in December 2008. Her husband, Edward Kamens, served as interim Master before Paul Hudak was appointed to a five-year term. 

In the fall of 2009, computer science professor Paul Hudak became the ninth master of Saybrook.  One of the designers of the Haskell programming language, Hudak was well known for his prowess in programming languages.  A jazz pianist, Hudak combined his interest in programming languages and music to do work in Haskore, a programming language used for sound production.  Beyond computer science, Hudak was an avid sports fan, and was head coach of Hamden High's women's lacrosse team for eight years.  He was married to Cathy Van Dyke, and had two daughters, Cris Hudak and Jen Hudak. He was also the only Master of Saybrook to have participated in the Saybrook Strip. In November 2010 Paul Hudak took a medical leave of absence from Yale, and former Saybrook Master Edward Kamens agreed to serve as interim master until Hudak returned at the beginning of the 2011-2012 school year. Hudak eventually resigned from the mastership and died three months later. 

Christine Muller, a professor of American Studies, replaced longtime Saybrook dean Paul McKinley after the 2011-2012 academic year.

In 2016, the title of "Master" was changed to "Head of College".

Notable alumni
James Whitmore '45W – actor; has won a Golden Globe Award, a Grammy Award, a Primetime Emmy Award, a Theatre World Award, and a Tony Award, plus two Academy Award nominations
Dick Cavett '58 – talk show host
Richard Posner '59 – United States Federal Judge
A. Bartlett Giamatti '60 – former President of Yale and Commissioner of Major League Baseball
Oliver Stone '68 – film director, producer, and screenwriter
Donald Verrilli '79 – United States Solicitor General, 2011–2016
Maya Lin '81 – designer and sculptor
Elizabeth Kolbert '83 – Pulitzer-Prize winning journalist
Charles Rivkin '84 – CEO of the Motion Pictures Association; former US Ambassador to France and Monaco
Gideon Rose, '85 – member of the Council on Foreign Relations and former editor of Foreign Affairs
Kellie Martin '01 – actress

References

External links
Saybrook College Home Page
Saybrook College Orchestra
Yale.edu, 60th reunion

Residential colleges of Yale University
University and college dormitories in the United States